Hitler–Beneš–Tito: National Conflicts, World Wars, Genocides, Expulsions, and Divided Remembrance in East-Central and Southeastern Europe, 1848–2018 is a book by Austrian historian Arnold Suppan and published by Austrian Academy of Sciences Press. The book was first published in 2013 in German as Hitler–Beneš–Tito: Konflikt, Krieg und Völkermord in Ostmittel-und Südosteuropa. The English translation was published in 2019.

The book got several reviews.

References

External links
 (free full access)

2013 non-fiction books
Austrian Academy of Sciences Press books
History books about the Holocaust
Ethnic cleansing of Germans
21st-century history books
History books about ethnic cleansing